Holy Week in Viveiro (Semana Santa de Viveiro)  is one of the most important traditional events of Viveiro, Spain. It is celebrated in the week leading up to Easter (Holy Week among Christians), and is one of the best known religious events within Galicia. As a reflection of its importance, is also considered as a Fiesta of International Tourist Interest of Spain since 2013.

This week features the procession of pasos, floats of lifelike wooden sculptures of individual scenes of the events of the Passion, or images of the Virgin Mary showing restrained grief for the torture and killing of her son. Some of the sculptures are of great antiquity and are considered artistic masterpieces, as well as being culturally and spiritually important to the local Catholic population.

During Holy Week, the city is crowded with residents and visitors, drawn by the spectacle and atmosphere. The impact is particularly strong for the Catholic community. The processions are organised by hermandades and cofradías, religious brotherhoods. During the processions, members precede the pasos, dressed in penitential robes. They may also be accompanied by brass bands.

The processions work along a designated route from their home churches and chapels, usually via a central viewing area and back. As of 2011, a total of 15 processions are scheduled for the week, from the previous Friday to  Palm Sunday through to Easter Sunday afternoon.

See also
Viveiro
Holy Week in Spain
Fiestas of International Tourist Interest of Spain

References
Notes

Bibliography
 Adrán Goás, Carlos; Kawamura Kawamura, Yayoi; Pardo de Cela, Santiago F. (2001) (in Spanish). Cruces parroquiales de la ribera del Landro. Fundación Caixa Galicia. 
Chao Espina, Enrique (1988) (en español). Historia de Viveiro (Documentos para a historia contemporánea de Galicia). Ediciós do Castro. .
Donapetry Yribarnegaray, Juan (1953) (in Spanish). Historia de Vivero y su concejo. Diputación Provincial de Lugo. .
Fernández García, M. Begoña (2000) (in Spanish). La imaginería religiosa en la Semana Santa de Viveiro. .
VV.AA. (2008) (in Spanish). La Semana Santa en Galicia. Hércules de Ediciones. .

External links

SemanaSantaViveiro.com - Holy Week in Viveiro official website

Viveiro
Tourist attractions in Galicia (Spain)